Eilema griseoflava is a moth of the subfamily Arctiinae first described by Walter Rothschild in 1912. It is found in the Philippines.

References

griseoflava